The 2018 Elon Phoenix football team represented Elon University in the 2018 NCAA Division I FCS football season. They were led by second-year head coach Curt Cignetti and played their home games at Rhodes Stadium. They were members of the Colonial Athletic Association (CAA). They finished the season 6–5, 4–3 in CAA play to finish in sixth place. They received an at-large bid to the FCS Playoffs where they were lost to Wofford in the first round.

On December 14, head coach Curt Cignetti resigned to become the head coach at James Madison. He finished at Elon with a two-year record of 14–9.

Previous season
The Phoenix finished the 2017 season 8–4, 6–2 in CAA play to finish in third place. They received an at-large bid to the FCS Playoffs where they lost to Furman in the first round.

Preseason

CAA Poll
In the CAA preseason poll released on July 24, 2018, the Phoenix were predicted to finish in fifth place.

Preseason All-CAA Team
The Phoenix had two players selected to the preseason all-CAA team.

Offense

CJ Toogood – OL

Defense

Warren Messer – LB

Award watch lists

Schedule

Source:

Game summaries

at South Florida

Furman

at Charleston Southern

New Hampshire

at James Madison

at Delaware

Richmond

Rhode Island

Towson

at Maine

FCS Playoffs

at Wofford–First Round

Ranking movements

Players drafted into the NFL

References

Elon
Elon Phoenix football seasons
Elon
Elon Phoenix football